Jason Damm (born 26 January 1995) is an American rugby union player, currently playing for . His preferred position is flanker or number 8.

Early career
Damm is from Marietta, Georgia and attended Clemson University.

Professional career
Damm signed for the Glendale Raptors for the 2019 Major League Rugby season. He moved to Rugby ATL ahead of the 2020 Major League Rugby season, and has remained with the side since.

Damm debuted for the United States in July 2022 against Chile. He would go on to represent the USA Falcons XV on their tour of South America in October 2022.

References

External links
itsrugby.co.uk Profile

1995 births
Living people
American rugby union players
United States international rugby union players
Rugby union flankers
Rugby union number eights
American Raptors players
Rugby ATL players